Dorna Candrenilor is a commune located in Suceava County, Bukovina, northeastern Romania. It is composed of three villages: namely Dealu Floreni, Dorna Candrenilor, and Poiana Negrii. It included five other villages until 2003, when these were split off to form Coșna Commune. 

There is a small aerodrome in Dealu Floreni. Two well-known Romanian brands of mineral water, more specifically Dorna and Poiana Negrii, trace their name from this area.

Natives 

 Vladimir Todașcă

References 

Communes in Suceava County
Localities in Southern Bukovina